Headington School Oxford Boat Club (HSOBC for short) is a rowing club on the River Thames currently based in rented premises at St Edwards School Boathouse on Godstow Road, Oxford, Oxfordshire. It is the rowing club belonging to Headington School.

History
The club was founded in 1991. In June 2019 the club was given planning permission to build their own boat house on a new site called Maddy Moorings, on the High Street near Long Wittenham at coordinates .

Honours

National champions

Key
W women, +coxed, -coxless, x sculls, J junior, 18 16, 15, 14 age group

National Schools' Regatta

Henley Royal Regatta

See also
Rowing on the River Thames

References

Sport in Oxfordshire
Sport in Oxford
Organisations based in Oxford
Buildings and structures in Oxford
Buildings and structures on the River Thames
Rowing clubs in England
Rowing clubs in Oxfordshire
Rowing clubs of the River Thames
Scholastic rowing in the United Kingdom